The Magyarab are a community living along the Nile River in Egypt and Sudan. They are of Hungarian ancestry, probably dating back to the late 16th century, when both parts of Hungary and Egypt were part of the Ottoman Empire.

Name 

The name "Magyarab" is not a portmanteau of the words "Magyar" and "Arab" as is commonly assumed.   Rather, the name is a concatenation of "Magyar" (Hungarian) and "Ab" which in Nubian simply means "tribe". So Magyarab combined translates to "Tribe of the Magyars." In fact, to the Magyarab people, their Hungarian identity specifically sets them apart from the surrounding Egyptians.

History 

According to legend, Christian Hungarians who had only recently been brought under the control of the Ottoman Empire formed a part of the Ottoman army that was fighting in southern Egypt. Supposedly, a portion or the entirety of the fighting unit remained there and intermarried with the local Nubian women.

According to local Magyarabs, their ancestor was Ibrahim el-Magyar, a general who came from Buda (present-day Budapest) in 1517, he married with a local Nubian woman, they had a son called Ali. Ali had five sons (Selami, Mustafa, Djelal Eddin, Musa and Iksa), and Ali's five sons were the ancestor of all Magyarabs. Magyarabs have been members of the World Federation of Hungarians (Magyarok Világszövetsége) since 1992 and still consider themselves as Hungarians.

They were not discovered by Europeans until 1935, when László Almásy, himself Hungarian, and his co-worker, the German engineer and explorer Hansjoachim von der Esch, happened upon the tribe in the Nubian region. Representatives of the tribes later attempted to make contact with Hungarian officials, but were unable to do so because of the outbreak of World War II.

These people now have a mixed race appearance due to the intermarriage with the local Nubian population and do not speak the Hungarian language. Around 1934, however, Esch, who spent several weeks with the population of the Magyarab island at Wadi Halfa, put together a list of non-Arabic words used only on that island and which, according to him, were recognized by Almásy as similar to Hungarian words. His notes show that all Magyarab in Wadi Halfa were convinced that their ancestors came from "Nemsa" (the Arabic word for Austria), which might refer to any region of the Austro-Hungarian Empire. He was told by the leader of the Magyarab island village that their ancestors had arrived in Egypt/Sudan as a group of "Austrian" soldiers led by a man called Shenghal Sendjer, which Esch assumes to be originally General Sendjer or Senger.

Magyarab communities 

Proverbs about the Magyarab 

The people of many different ethnicities neighboring the Magyarab have proverbs that tell us more about the historical Magyarab people.

Al-majāri lā yisālli fil-mesjīd. – The Hungarian does not pray in the mosque.

Rā's al-majār zejj al-hajjār. – The Hungarian's head is as hard as a stone.

Al-majārī yilbis burneta. – The Hungarian wears a hat.

References and notes 
Detailed report about a Hungarian expedition:

 Islands on the Nile - The Csángós of Africa, the Magyarabs (1), Magyar Nemzet, Budapest, 10 03 2007 
 Islands on the Nile - The Csángós of Africa, the Magyarabs (2), Magyar Nemzet, Budapest, 17 03 2007 
 Islands on the Nile - The Csángós of Africa, the Magyarabs (3), Magyar Nemzet, Budapest, 24 03 2007 

Other references:
 Hungarians along the Nile, Demokrata, Budapest, 17 07 1997 (Archive)

External links 
Topographic map of the Wadi Halfa region in 1958 (prior to the filling of Lake Nasser/Nubia) which shows "Magarab I." (i.e., Magyarab Island) near the top. Published by the British War Office and Air Ministry in 1960.

 
Ethnic groups in Egypt
Ethnic groups in Sudan
Ottoman period in Hungary